Imperial Doom is the debut album by American death metal band Monstrosity. It was released on May 26, 1992, through Nuclear Blast. The album sold 40,000 copies worldwide and received excellent ratings in the press. The album was supported by a European tour, but a little later, following disagreements regarding royalties, Monstrosity left Nuclear Blast.

Track listing
All lyrics by Lee Harrison. All music as noted.

Personnel
Monstrosity
George "Corpsegrinder" Fisher – vocals
Jason Gobel – guitars
Jon Rubin – guitars
Mark Van Erp – bass
Lee Harrison – drums
Production
Monstrosity – production
Jim Morris – recording, engineering, production
Dan Seagrave – artwork
Markus Staiger – executive production

References

External links

Monstrosity (band) albums
1992 debut albums
Albums with cover art by Dan Seagrave
Nuclear Blast albums